Donald William Shaw (3 February 1939 – 12 November 2021) was a British rower. He competed in the men's eight event at the 1960 Summer Olympics.

Shaw attended Ludgrove School as a child. He graduated from Keble College, Oxford.

References

1939 births
Living people
British male rowers
Olympic rowers of Great Britain
Rowers at the 1960 Summer Olympics
People educated at Ludgrove School
Alumni of Keble College, Oxford